Dorothy Edith Smith  (née Place; 6 July 1926 – 3 June 2022) was a British-born Canadian ethnographer, feminist studies scholar, sociologist, and writer with research interests in a variety of disciplines. These include women's studies, feminist theory, psychology, and educational studies. Smith is also involved in certain subfields of sociology, such as the sociology of knowledge, family studies, and methodology. She founded the sociological sub-disciplines of feminist standpoint theory and institutional ethnography.

Biography 
Smith was born on 6 July 1926, in Northallerton, North Riding of Yorkshire, England, to Dorothy F. Place and Tom Place, who also had three sons. Her mother was a university-trained chemist who had been engaged in the women's suffrage movement as a young woman, and her father was a timber merchant. One of her brothers, Ullin Place, was known for his work on consciousness as a process of the brain, and another was poet Milner Place.

At the age of twenty-five, Smith entered the work force as a secretary in the book publishing industry, but this left her wanting more. After this realization, Smith completed her undergraduate degree at the London School of Economics, earning her B.Sc. in sociology with a major in social anthropology in 1955. She then married William Reid Smith, whom she had met while attending LSE, and they moved to the United States. They both attended graduate school at the University of California, Berkeley, where she received her Ph.D. in sociology in 1963, nine months after the birth of their second child. Not long afterward she and her husband were divorced; she retained custody of the children. She then taught as a lecturer at UC Berkeley from 1964 to 1966. Smith started teaching sociology, and was the only female teacher in a faculty of 44.

Following the divorce, Smith was lacking in day care and family support while trying to raise her two children alone and as a result decided to move back to England in the late 60s. While she was there she gave lectures on sociology at the University of Essex, Colchester. In 1968, Smith moved with her two sons to Vancouver, British Columbia to teach at the University of British Columbia, where she helped to establish a Women's Studies Program. In 1977 she moved to Toronto, Ontario to work at the Ontario Institute for Studies in Education, where she lived until she retired. In 1994 she became an adjunct professor at the University of Victoria, where she continued her work in institutional ethnography. Smith served on the international advisory board for the feminist journal Signs.

Smith died of complications of a fall at her home in Vancouver on 3 June 2022, at the age of 95.

Familial Influences 
Dorothy Smith came from a long line of feminist activists. Each of these familial figures had an impact on Smith’s sociological theories and ideas. Most notably were Margaret Fox, Lucy Ellison Abraham, and Dorothy Foster Place.

Margaret Fox née Fell was the feminist leader of the 17th century Quaker movement. Often referred to as the “mother of Quakerism” she opened her home to be used as one of the first headquarters for the Quaker religious Society of Friends. Lucy Ellison Abraham and Dorothy Foster Place were Dorothy Smith’s grandmother and mother respectively. Both were members of the Women’s Social and Political Union (WSPU) and engaged in militant suffrage activism. Abraham participated mostly in the organizational and office work, while Place was more active, even getting arrested once during a window breaking campaign.

Smith’s own identity as a Marxist-feminist developed during the 1970s, when her life history and the on going women’s movement merged to contribute to her life and sociological practices. The Vancouver Women’s Movement from 1968-1977 proved to be a key moment in the development of Smith’s identity. The combination of Smith’s feminist ancestry and her own experiences in women’s movements went on to shape her standpoint theory. Through watching and learning about her familial history and how each of the three women previously mentioned addressed feminism and the inequality of women through their roles as women Smith transformed these actions into a theory. Smith’s standpoint theory argues that the origin of standpoint came from women’s experiences as housewives. Each of her three ancestors were housewives and that added to and shaped their approach to feminism and activism.

Standpoint theory 
Before Smith, American feminist theorist Sandra Harding conducted the 1986 study, The Science Question in Feminism, which created the concept of standpoint theory in order to emphasize the knowledge of women, arguing that hierarchies naturally created ignorance about social reality and critical questions among those whom the hierarchies favored. However, those at the bottom of these ladders had a perspective that made it easier to explain social problems.

Standpoint theory is rooted in the idea that what one knows is impacted by their position in society. It also contains three main beliefs: no one can have complete and objective knowledge, no two people can have exactly the same standpoint, and we must not take for granted our own standpoint. Smith emphasized the importance of recognizing our standpoint and utilizing it as the entry point to our investigation. Smith’s overall goal with standpoint theory was to fully account for the perspectives of different genders and their effects on our reality. 

It was during her time as a graduate student in the 1960s that Smith developed her notion of standpoint, shaping Harding's theory. During this time, Smith recognized that she herself was experiencing "two subjectivities, home and university", and that these two worlds could not be blended. In recognition of her own standpoint, Smith shed light on the fact that sociology was lacking in the acknowledgment of standpoint.  At this point, the methods and theories of sociology had been formed upon and built in a male-dominated social world, unintentionally ignoring the women's world of sexual reproduction, children, and household affairs. Women's duties are seen as natural parts of society, rather than as an addition to culture. Smith believed that asking questions from a female's perspective could provide insight into social institutions. Smith determined that for minority groups, the constant separation between the world as they experience it versus continually having to adapt to the view of the dominant group creates oppression, which can lead to members of the marginalized group feeling alienated from their "true" selves. Smith compared the women's experience to the women's standpoint, and believed that women's oppression was grounded in male control. The idea that women shared a method in their experiences with oppression was enforced by Smith.

Connection to Marxism 
The idea that not all standpoints are viewed equally shows how Smith’s take on standpoint theory also draws direct connections with Marxism. This inequality in standpoints and how they are perceived in society reflects Marxist ideas of the impact of social, economic, and political relations on shaping and determining oppression.

Example 
Smith often used one particular story as an example of the importance of standpoint theory, and as a way of explaining it:

One day, while riding in a train in Ontario, Smith observed a family of Indians standing together by a river, watching the train pass by. It was only after having made these initial assumptions that Smith realized that they were just that; they were assumptions, assumptions that she had no way of knowing if they were true or not. She called them "Indians", but she couldn't have known, for sure, what their origins were. She called them a family, which could have very well not been true. She also said they were watching the train go by, an assumption that emerged solely based on her position in time and space, her position riding in the train, looking out at the "family".

For Smith, this served as a representation of her own privilege, through which she made assumptions and immediately imposed them on the group of "Indians". It helped lead her to the conclusion that experiences differ, across space, time, and circumstance. It is unfair to create society—and ruling relations—based on only one point of view/being.

Institutional ethnography 

Institutional ethnography (IE) is a sociological method of inquiry which Smith developed, created to explore the social relations that structure people's everyday lives. For the institutional ethnographer, ordinary daily activity becomes the site for an investigation of social organization. Smith developed IE as Marxist feminist sociology
"for women, for people";
it is now used by researchers in the social sciences, in education, in human services and in policy research as a method for mapping the translocal relations that coordinate people's activities within institutions. Smith insisted that her outline of Institutional ethnography would be expanded upon in a collaborative manner amongst sociologists, emphasizing the networking needed to progress the idea.

Smith uses the example of the everyday act of walking her dog to show how a benign act can actually be used for sociological investigation. She claims that in walking her dog and allowing it to do its business on some lawns, but not others actually reaffirms the class system. In choosing which lawns are acceptable or not for her dog she is reaffirming the differences in forms of property ownership. 

In her work on sociology for women, Smith spent time attempting to show that the standpoint of women has been historically excluded from aspects of life related to professional ruling. Meaning managing, organizing, and administering. Here Smith highlights how important it is to investigate how the everyday worlds we live in are shaped by the institutions we are surrounded by. In this case Smith defines institutions as complex, functional organizations, in which many forms and groups are interwoven. Institutional processes then particular actions into standardized and generalized forms.  Smith draws on Marx’s discussion of commodity relations: when goods and services are exchanged in the market setting, their value appears in the form of money. In a similar way, bureaucratic forms of organization make actions accountable in terms of abstract and generalized categories.

Lecture video 
Smith gave a recorded lecture introducing her work and thoughts on institutional ethnography. This lecture was hosted at the Dalla Lana School of Public Health on November 5, 2018.

Ruling relations 
Smith also developed the concept of ruling relations, the institutional complexes that "coordinate the everyday work of administration and the lives of those subject to administrative regimes". This allows a society to have control and organization, with examples being systems of bureaucracy and management. It also defines how they will interact with one another. Smith argues that ruling relations dehumanize people. She focuses on how it can limit women to only being seen in their traditional roles of mother, wife, homemaker, or housekeeper.

Bifurcation of consciousness 
Bifurcation is defined as dividing or separating into two parts or branches. Smith argued that there is a split between the world that an individual actually experiences and the dominant view that one is supposed to adapt, in this case being the male-dominated view. In the case of the bifurcation of consciousness, specifically related to standpoint theory, this refers to the separation of the two modes of being for women. Since sociology is a male-dominated field, women must fight to push past their expected roles as housewives and mothers, moving from the local realm of the home to the "extra local" realm of society. Women, therefore, split their consciousness in two in order to establish themselves as knowledgeable and competent beings within society and the field of sociology.

Influences 
Smith had influential ties to theorists such as Karl Marx and Alfred Schütz. Building on top of Marxist theory, Smith evolved alienation into gender-stratified capitalism, explaining in her work Feminism and Marxism how "objective social, economic and political relations ... shape and determine women's oppression". From Schutz, Smith explains, "Individuals are experienced as 'types'", developing upon his concept of umwelt and mitwelt relations. In The Everyday World as Problematic: A Feminist Sociology, Smith explains mitwelt and umwelt relations of male dominance claiming, "women's work conceals from men the actual concrete forms on which their work depends". Smith was also influenced by George Herbert Mead after taking one of his classes, as well as Maurice Merleau-Ponty, after stumbling upon one of his books.

Umwelt and mitwelt 
Alfred Schütz describes mitwelt relationships as less intimate than umwelt relationships. Mitwelt relations refer more to a type of relation, such as an individual and their mail carrier. Umwelt relations are found on a more intimate level, such as a husband and wife. Smith extends these concepts by demonstrating how umwelt is more "central in women's lives, and men relegate their umwelt relations to women".

Professional recognition 
While Smith's early essays were influential in the emergence of sex and gender education in sociology, her work is neglected by other sociologists. However, in recognition of her contributions in the "transformation of sociology", and for extending the boundaries of "feminist standpoint theory" to "include race, class, and gender", Smith received numerous awards from the American Sociological Association, including the American Sociological Association's Career of Distinguished Scholarship Award (1999) and the Jessie Bernard Award for Feminist Sociology (1993). In recognition of her scholarship, she also received two awards from the Canadian Sociological Association and the Canadian Anthropological Association; the Outstanding Contribution Award (1990) and the John Porter Award for her book The Everyday World as Problematic: A Feminist Sociology (1990). In 2019 she was named as a member of the Order of Canada.

Her work is ranked among the most important produced in 20th and 21st Century sociology, and it has been suggested that Institutional Ethnography should be considered a contemporary classic.

The Everyday World as Problematic: A Feminist Sociology (1987) 
Smith wrote chapters two and three of The Everyday World as a Problematic: A Feminist Sociology between 1977 and 1981. Her concept of the line of fault is the notion of recognizing the male biases as a society and being conscious from a woman's perspective and noticing the inequality between male and female. In Toronto, while teaching at Ontario Institute of Studies, Smith published her paper about everyday lives as a woman, and the sociology behind the everyday housewife and mother. Her work intended to create a sociology for women, as this is a male dominated field. Smith wanted to create a field of sociology that questioned the everyday problems of life.

Selected works 
 Simply Institutional Ethnography: Creating a Sociology for People (2022, ISBN 978-1487528065)
 Institutional Ethnography: A Sociology for People (2005)
 Mothering for Schooling, co-author with Alison Griffith (2004)
 Writing the Social: Critique, Theory, and Investigations (1999)
 The Conceptual Practices of Power: A Feminist Sociology of Knowledge (1990)
 Texts, Facts, and Femininity: Exploring the Relations of Ruling (1990)
 The Everyday World as Problematic: A Feminist Sociology (1987)
 Feminism and Marxism: A Place to Begin, A Way to Go (1977)
 Women Look at Psychiatry: I'm Not Mad, I'm Angry—Collection edited by Smith and David (1975), Press Gang Publishing
 Sociological Theory Vol.10 No.1: Sociology from Women's Experience: A Reaffirmation (1992)
 What It Might Mean to Do a Canadian Sociology: The Everyday World as Problematic (1975)

References 

1926 births
2022 deaths
Alumni of the London School of Economics
British emigrants to Canada
British ethnographers
British expatriate academics in Canada
British sociologists
British women anthropologists
Canadian academics of women's studies
Canadian ethnographers
Canadian feminists
Canadian socialist feminists
Canadian sociologists
Canadian women anthropologists
Canadian women sociologists
Feminist studies scholars
Marxist feminists
Members of the Order of Canada
People from Northallerton
Scientists from Vancouver
Academic staff of the University of British Columbia
University of California, Berkeley alumni
Academic staff of the University of Toronto
Academic staff of the University of Victoria
Writers from Vancouver
Writers from Yorkshire